Senator Dawson

Dan Dawson (politician) (born 1978), Iowa State Senator
Glenn Dawson (born 1944), Illinois State Senator
M. Mandy Dawson (born 1956), Florida State Senate
William A. Dawson (1903–1981), Utah State Senate
William Crosby Dawson (1798–1856), Georgia State Senate